The saddle carpetshark (Cirrhoscyllium japonicum) is a carpet shark of the family Parascylliidae found around Japan, between latitudes 35°N and 24°N, at depths between .

References

 
 

saddle carpetshark
Fish of Japan
saddle carpetshark